The 2019 MoneyLion 300 was a NASCAR Xfinity Series race held on April 27, 2019, at Talladega Superspeedway in Lincoln, Alabama. Contested over 113 laps on the 2.66 mile (4.28 km) superspeedway, it was the ninth race of the 2019 NASCAR Xfinity Series season. This was the season's third Dash 4 Cash race.

Background

Track

Talladega Superspeedway, formerly known as Alabama International Motor Speedway, is a motorsports complex located north of Talladega, Alabama. It is located on the former Anniston Air Force Base in the small city of Lincoln. A tri-oval, the track was constructed in 1969 by the International Speedway Corporation, a business controlled by the France family. Talladega is most known for its steep banking. The track currently hosts NASCAR's Monster Energy NASCAR Cup Series, Xfinity Series and Gander Outdoors Truck Series. Talladega is the longest NASCAR oval with a length of 2.66-mile-long (4.28 km) tri-oval like the Daytona International Speedway, which is a 2.5-mile-long (4.0 km).

Dash 4 Cash
For this race, Cole Custer, Austin Cindric, Justin Allgaier, and Tyler Reddick had qualified for Dash 4 Cash at the previous race. Custer was the defending winner of the award.

Entry list

Practice

First practice

Final practice

Qualifying

Qualifying results

. – Eligible for Dash 4 Cash prize money

Race

Summary
Michael Annett began on pole. Brandon Jones spun out early during Stage 1, which was won by Tyler Reddick after he overtook Annett before the first lap. Noah Gragson would win Stage 2. Gragson brought out the fifth caution of the race when he spun out trying to overtake Reddick on lap 86. 

Annett got loose and crashed into Justin Allgaier and Cole Custer on lap 96, though Allgaier's car was able to get repaired and return to the race. Annett and Custer were eliminated in the crash, which also collected Stephen Leicht, Austin Cindric, Ryan Sieg, and Cody Ware. Nearing the end of the race on lap 110, Jeffrey Earnhardt got loose and caused a Big One that took out Allgaier, Jeremy Clements, and Timmy Hill. David Starr and Alex Labbé also were involved but stayed in the race. The race was won by Reddick despite the minor damage to his car. He was able to hold off Gray Gaulding (who had his highest finish in the series) and the rest of the field after a late restart, also winning the Dash 4 Cash prize money.

Stage Results

Stage One
Laps: 25

Stage Two
Laps: 25

Final Stage Results

Stage Three
Laps: 83

. – Won the Dash 4 Cash prize money and subsequently qualified for the Dash 4 Cash prize money in the next race.

. – Qualified for Dash 4 Cash prize money in the next race.

References

NASCAR races at Talladega Superspeedway
2019 in sports in Alabama
MoneyLion 300
2019 NASCAR Xfinity Series